Indanan "Dan" Kasim Daud (LP) is a Filipino politician and current mayor of Maluso in Basilan (2010–13).

References

Liberal Party (Philippines) politicians
Mayors of places in Basilan
Living people
Year of birth missing (living people)
Filipino Muslims